The Essential Michael Bolton is a two-disc compilation album by American singer Michael Bolton, released on April 25, 2005. It is a repacked version of Michael Bolton's 2002 album The Ultimate Collection. In 2005, a DVD was released with the album containing all 32 music videos. The album only charted in Denmark. In 2009, Columbia released a 3.0 edition of The Essential Michael Bolton containing eight bonus tracks.

Track listing

Disc one

Disc two

Charts

Release history

References 

Michael Bolton albums
2005 compilation albums
Columbia Records compilation albums
Sony Music compilation albums
2005 video albums
Music video compilation albums